Margy Kinmonth is a British film director and producer.

Covering a wide range of genres, her award-winning films include feature documentaries Revolution: New Art for a New World, Hermitage Revealed, Royal Paintbox with King Charles III, War Art with Eddie Redmayne, Looking for Lowry, Mariinsky Theatre, The Nutcracker Story, The Secret World of Haute Couture,The Strange World of Barry Who? and Naked Hollywood.

Kinmonth has received numerous awards for her work, including the BAFTA for Best Documentary Series, the Royal Television Society Arts Award and the Creative Originality Award at the Women in Film and Television Awards.

She is the founding director of independent film company Foxtrot Films Ltd.

Kinmonth’s most recent project is the feature documentary Eric Ravilious: Drawn to War (2022), released by Dartmouth Films. This is the first major feature film to be made about Eric Ravilious, artist who was killed in a plane crash over Iceland in 1942.

Early life and education 
Kinmonth was educated at St Paul’s Girls School in London, followed by a foundation in drawing and painting at the Byam Shaw School of Art. She received her Bachelor of Fine Arts degree at Bath Academy of Art in Corsham, specialising in film and animation.

Career 
Kinmonth spent her early career as a producer and director of television and radio commercials. She worked for Wasey Campbell Ewald, part of The Interpublic Group of Companies and at the Central Office of Information. She then moved to Granada TV in Manchester, where she started to research, write and direct current affairs programmes.

In 1981, Kinmonth founded independent production company Foxtrot Films Ltd to make films celebrating art and culture. Her first film To The Western World with John Huston premiered at the London Film Festival. She then worked as a freelance director for BBC, ITV and MTV, making films including South of Watford with Hugh Laurie in 1986 and a profile of Steven Berkoff for The South Bank Show with Melvyn Bragg, featuring Roman Polanski and Mikhail Baryshnikov. In 1990, she directed the series Naked Hollywood on the motion picture industry, featuring Arnold Schwarzenegger, James Caan, Nora Ephron, Oliver Stone, Terry Gilliam and Harvey Weinstein. The series won her a BAFTA Award for Best Documentary Series.

After moving into drama in the 1990s, Kinmonth directed episodes of BBC1's Grange Hill, Casualty with Robson Green and Sophie Okenado, and Eastenders with Ross Kemp and June Brown. She then directed a biography of playwright Simon Gray in The Smoking Diaries, featuring Harold Pinter.

In the 2000s, Kinmonth started to present investigative biographies, including The Strange World of Barry Who? about the lives of Francis Bacon and Rudolph Nureyev. Her film The Secret World of Haute Couture with Karl Lagerfeld and John Galliano explored the world of the elite fashion industry.

Starting from 2007, Kinmonth investigated the Russian world of ballet, opera and art in a series of films. Nutcracker Story explored the cultural phenomenon behind Tchaikovsky's ballet The Nutcracker, from its genesis through to the present day. In 2008, Mariinsky Theatre celebrated the 225th anniversary of Saint Petersburg's Mariinsky Theatre and featured Valery Gergiev, Plácido Domingo, Anna Netrebko. In Hermitage Revealed, she became the first foreign director to be granted permission to film the story of the Hermitage Museum in Saint Petersburg, including rare behind-the-scenes access to the archives. The film was premiered at the Moscow International Film Festival and the Solomon R. Guggenheim Museum in New York in June 2014.

In 2017, to mark the centenary of the Russian Revolution, Kinmonth directed the feature documentary Revolution: New Art for a New World about the artists of the Revolution, which premiered at the Louvre in Paris and was shown theatrically in 34 countries.

Her films about the art world have included Looking for Lowry with Ian McKellen, Noel Gallagher and Paula Rego, War Art with Eddie Redmayne and feature documentary Royal Paintbox with King Charles III.

Kinmonth’s latest film, Eric Ravilious - Drawn to War was the second most successful doc in UK theatrically of 2022. The film features Ai Weiwei, Alan Bennett, Grayson Perry, Robert Macfarlane with Freddie Fox and Tamsin Greig.

It won the Best Documentary Campaign at the Big Screen Awards 2022, and Best Documentary Film at La Femme International Film Festival. It was nominated at The Master of Art Film Festival in 2022, and was an Official Selection of the Purbeck Film Festival in 2022.

Charity Work 
Kinmonth has worked with the charity Amnesty International, directing the feature doc film Remember the Secret Policeman’s Ball? produced by Roger Graef, and starring Rowan Atkinson, Dawn French, Jennifer Saunders, Michael Palin and Sting.

Kinmonth’s feature documentary film Royal Paintbox, made with King Charles III, supported the Royal Drawing School in promoting the art of drawing from observation.

Kinmonth worked with Combat Stress, the charity for veterans' mental health, on War Art with Eddie Redmayne, about WW1, shown on ITV network.

Accolades

Winner, European Community Award 1981 for To the Western World
Winner, BAFTA Best Documentary Series
Winner, Cable ACE Award for Best Documentary, Naked Hollywood
Winner, Chicago Film Festival Silver Hugo for Best Documentary, Naked Hollywood
Winner, Royal Television Society Arts Award, 2002 The Strange World of Barry Who?
Winner, Creative Originality Award at the Women in Film and Television Awards, 2009
Winner, The Likhachev Fellowship, 2017
Winner, Best Documentary Campaign, Big Screen Awards 2022, for Eric Ravilious - Drawn to War
Winner, Best Documentary Film, La Femme International Film Festival 2022, for Eric Ravilious - Drawn to War

Filmography

References

External links

http://www.foxtrotfilms.com

Living people
Year of birth missing (living people)
British documentary film directors
British women film directors
British documentary film producers
British women film producers
20th-century British screenwriters
21st-century British screenwriters
British women screenwriters
British women television writers